Red Billabong is a 2016 independent Australian horror thriller film, written and directed by Luke Sparke in his feature debut. Based on an Australian legend, Red Billabong follows two estranged brothers who find themselves stalked by a supernatural creature.

The movie premiered in Sydney on August 10, 2016 and had a wider Australian release on August 25, 2016.

Plot

In the Australian Outback, two estranged brothers discover old secrets and family lies when their grandfather's property is passed into their hands. When a shady land developer  shows interest in taking the property off their hands for a princely sum, Tristan (Pocock) wants to sell up, but Nick (Ewing) is concerned about a warning from grandad's friend, Mr. Garvey. Tristan's friends, including Nick's ex Anya, and drug dealer BJ, show up for a party in the brothers' new home. As both brothers are pulled apart by different choices, one thing is clear – something sinister is going on.  As their friends start to go missing they fear they are being stalked by something. An ancient Australian legend has now been unleashed.

Cast
 Dan Ewing as Nick
 Tim Pocock as Tristan
 Sophie Don as Anya
 Jessica Green as Rebecca
 Ben Chisholm as BJ
 John Reynolds as Sam
 Emily Joy as Kate
 James Striation as Jason
 Col Elliott as Clyde
 Gregory J. Fryer as Garvey
 Felix Williamson as Mr Richards

Production 
Shooting for the film began in September 2014 in Gold Coast, Queensland. A trailer was released in September 2015.

Reception 
In a review for The Reel Bits, Richard Gray said, "Red Billabong is not just a horror film, but a riddle to be solved within the framework of a typical splatterfest."

References

External links

Australian horror thriller films
Australian action adventure films
Australian comedy horror films
2010s English-language films